Darwin Lora (born 10 July 1986) is a Bolivian football midfielder who plays for COCHABAMBA F.C.

References

1986 births
Living people
Sportspeople from Cochabamba
Bolivian footballers
Club Aurora players
Club San José players
Nacional Potosí players
Sport Boys Warnes players
C.D. Palmaflor del Trópico players
Bolivian Primera División players
Association football midfielders